Fake Peak is a small outcrop on a ridge beside the Ruth Glacier in Denali National Park and Preserve in Alaska, US, 19 miles southeast of the summit of Denali. It has been shown by Robert M. Bryce that the "summit photograph" produced by Frederick Cook as evidence supporting his claim to have made the first ascent of Denali was taken on Fake Peak. At , this is almost  lower than the true summit of Denali.

References

Mountains of Matanuska-Susitna Borough, Alaska
Mountains of Alaska
Climbing areas of Alaska